Finland competed at the 1980 Summer Paralympics in Arnhem, Netherlands. 60 competitors from Finland won 40 medals including 8 gold, 19 silver and 13 bronze and finished 17th in the medal table.

See also 
 Finland at the Paralympics
 Finland at the 1980 Summer Olympics

References 

1980
1980 in Finnish sport
Nations at the 1980 Summer Paralympics